is a Japanese 4-panel yuri manga series written and illustrated by Tachi. The series began serialization in Houbunsha's seinen manga magazine Manga Time Kirara Miracle! magazine from March 2011. An anime television adaptation by Studio Deen aired in Japan between January and March 2014.

Plot
Haruka Takayama and Yū Sonoda were inseparable during middle school, but upon entering high school, they end up being seated on opposite sides of the classroom. Having to spend time with new friends, the two decide to make their relationship special by kissing each other in secret.

Characters
 
 
 Yū's best friend since junior high school. She often unknowingly pushes Yū to her demands (like kissing her just to keep her quiet), although Yū begins to do it more frequently without Haruka's personal request. Haruka at times is the extremely jealous and clingy type of person as described by Yū. Haruka harbors romantic feelings for Yū, a reason why she is more affected by their seating arrangement than Yū is. Haruka fantasizes about Yū in almost every situation and is the most romantic one in the relationships. She seems self-conscious about her chest size, preferring her breasts were smaller, such as claiming that they are a C cup when they are in fact D cup. In the manga, she becomes the student council vice president during her third year. Haruka and Yū become an official couple at the end of the manga.

 
 
 Haruka's best friend since junior high school. She is the childish one out of the two. She often acts more conservative than Haruka, but occasionally gives in to Haruka's requests. Yū initiates that she and Haruka do something special together, in order to comfort Haruka's growing insecurity about their friendship. But what began as a way to comfort a saddened friend soon turned into something much more for the both of them. Yū's favorite food is everything that tastes like green tea mochi (bread, pudding, ice cream, sweets, etc.). She also shares romantic feelings for Haruka. Whenever Haruka tries to make Yū kiss her, Yū will often act embarrassed, but occasionally she will give Haruka surprise kisses. Yū and Haruka become an official couple at the end of the manga.

 
 
 Haruka and Yū's classmate. A bright and energetic girl. Although she comes from a rich family and allegedly has an arranged fiancé, she is currently living with Shizuku and has romantic feelings for her. She is in a relationship with Shizuku and often initiates the kisses.

 
 
 Haruka and Yū's classmate. She has a generally sour look, meaning her happy or angry expressions tend to look overblown. She also shares a romantic relationship with Kotone and has stated that she likes her.

 
 
 Haruka and Yū's classmate and their class representative. Despite enjoying teasing others and playing pranks on them, she is actually quite perceptive, particularly when it comes to what Haruka and Yū might be up to. She went to middle school with Yuzu and Kotone and has two siblings; a brother and sister. She becomes the student council president during her third year, after Sumi graduates. Later on in the manga series, she develops romantic feelings for Yuzu. Kaede later confesses her feelings toward Yuzu, and the latter accepts her feelings. After her confession, Kaede sticks closer to Yuzu as well as teasing her more, often about their relationship when the other girls are around, much to Yuzu's embarrassment.

 
 
 Haruka and Yū's classmate, who has been friends with Kaede since elementary school. She seems oblivious to the hidden relationships around her. She has two ahoge that are reminiscent of the stem leaves of an actual yuzu and is often mistakenly called Mikan by Mitsuki. She is very tomboyish and athletic, as well as a good dancer. Later on in the manga series, Yuzu accepts Kaede's feelings for her after she confesses. She gets easily embarrassed when Kaede teases her about their relationship when the other girls are around since she wants to keep it low profile.

 
 
 Yū's older sister and the school's student council president. She is suspicious of the relationship between Haruka and Yū and often concocts plans with Kaede and Yuzu to catch them in the act. Like her sister Yū, she is also very fond of green tea mochi flavored foods. She develops a crush on Haruka and tends to have frequent delusions about them being intimate.

 
 
 A second year student who succeeds Mitsuki as student council president after she graduates. She often tries to speak in a particular manner, ending her sentences with "no ja", as she seems to find speaking normally embarrassing. She also has a habit of touching other girls' breasts. Her friends call her "Sumisumi". In the manga she asks Haruka if she can be called by her "little sister".

 
 
 The student council vice president and Mitsuki's classmate. She is in love with Mitsuki, despite knowing of Mitsuki's crush on Haruka.

 
 
 Kotone's little sister, who is often jealous of Shizuku being close to Kotone. She seems bratty, and acts harshly towards Shizuku because in the past Kotone would always abandon her to play with Shizuku.

 
 
 A classmate of Haruka and Yū from school.

 
 
 A classmate of Haruka and Yū from school.

 
 
 A classmate of Haruka and Yū from school.

 
 
 A classmate of Haruka and Yū from school.

 
 
 A teacher at Haruka and Yū's high school.

 
 
 A teacher at Haruka and Yū's high school.

 
 (Mother) 
 (Father) 

 
 
 Yū and Mitsuki's mother.

 
 
 Yū and Mitsuki's father.

 
 (Brother) 
 (Sister)

Media

Manga
The manga, illustrated by Tachi, began serialization in the first issue of Houbunsha's Manga Time Kirara Miracle magazine on March 17, 2011. Eight tankōbon volumes were released between August 27, 2012 and September 27, 2017.

Anime
A 12 episode anime television series adaptation of the manga series was announced in the August issue of the Manga Time Kirara Miracle! magazine. The series, produced by Studio Deen and directed by Kenichi Ishikura with character designs by Kyūta Sakai, aired on TBS between January 9, 2014 and March 27, 2014 and was simulcast by Crunchyroll in North America. The opening theme is "Won（*3*）Chu KissMe!" by Haruka Tomatsu, Yuka Iguchi, Yuka Aisaka, Hiromi Igarashi, Mai Fuchigami, and Megumi Toda, whilst the ending theme is "Kiss (and) Love" by Tomatsu and Iguchi. The series is licensed in North America by Sentai Filmworks. MVM Films have licensed the series in the UK.

Episode list

Video game
Characters from the series appear alongside other Manga Time Kirara characters in the 2017 mobile RPG, Kirara Fantasia.

Reception
Anime News Network's critics Rebecca Silverman and Zac Bertschy gave the first episode a rating of 3 out of 5 while Carl Kimlinger and Theron Martin gave it a 3.5 out of 5. Kotaku's Richard Eisenbeis called it his "favorite anime of the [2014] winter season".

References

External links
Anime official site at TBS 

Anime series based on manga
Romantic comedy anime and manga
Houbunsha manga
Japanese LGBT-related animated television series
School life in anime and manga
Seinen manga
Sentai Filmworks
Slice of life anime and manga
Studio Deen
TBS Television (Japan) original programming
Yuri (genre) anime and manga
Lesbian fiction
Yonkoma